Mount Pleasant Collegiate Institute Historic District is a national historic district located at Mount Pleasant, Cabarrus County, North Carolina. The district encompasses six contributing buildings associated with the Mount Pleasant Collegiate Institute, also known as Western Carolina Male Academy and North Carolina College. They are the three story brick Main Building (1854-1855); Greek Revival style President's House; Matthias Barrier house; Society Hall; the Boarding House (1868); and the New Building (1925). The Western Carolina Male Academy was established in 1852 by the North Carolina Synod of the Evangelical Lutheran Church of America. The institute closed in 1933 after which, in 1941, the property was put up to auction. The Lentz Hotel was moved inside the district boundaries in 1980.

It was listed on the National Register of Historic Places in 1979.

References

University and college buildings on the National Register of Historic Places in North Carolina
Historic districts on the National Register of Historic Places in North Carolina
Greek Revival architecture in North Carolina
Buildings and structures in Cabarrus County, North Carolina
National Register of Historic Places in Cabarrus County, North Carolina